Roshchinsky (masculine), Roshchinskaya (feminine), or Roshchinskoye (neuter) is the name of several inhabited localities in Russia.

Urban localities
Roshchinsky, Samara Oblast, an urban-type settlement in Volzhsky District of Samara Oblast

Rural localities
Roshchinsky, Republic of Bashkortostan, a selo in Roshchinsky Selsoviet of Sterlitamaksky District of the Republic of Bashkortostan
Roshchinsky, Krasnoyarsk Krai, a settlement in Roshchinsky Selsoviet of Kuraginsky District of Krasnoyarsk Krai
Roshchinsky, Lipetsk Oblast, a settlement in Shishkinsky Selsoviet of Chaplyginsky District of Lipetsk Oblast
Roshchinsky, Novosibirsk Oblast, a settlement in Iskitimsky District of Novosibirsk Oblast
Roshchinsky, Omsk Oblast, a settlement in Yuryevsky Rural Okrug of Kormilovsky District of Omsk Oblast
Roshchinsky, Stavropol Krai, a khutor in Georgiyevsky Selsoviet of Kochubeyevsky District of Stavropol Krai